The Chocolate Dandies is a Broadway musical in two acts that opened September 1, 1924, at the New Colonial Theatre and ran for 96 performances – finishing November 22, 1924.

Initial production 
The 1924 debut of The Chocolate Dandies was produced by Bertram Cecil Whitney (1870–1929). Eubie Blake composed the music; Noble Sissle wrote the lyrics and co-authored the book; Lew Payton was also co-author; Julian Mitchell staged it; Lorenzo C. Calduel (aka Lawrence Caldwell; born 1888, Mexico) scored the orchestral and vocal parts; John Newton Booth, Jr. (1890–1949), Kiviette, and Hugh Willoughby (1891–1973) designed the costumes; Tony Greshoff (né Anton Greshoff; 1870–1943) did the lighting design.

Reviews

See also 
 The Chocolate Dandies jazz combos, spin-offs from the musical production
 Josephine Baker, who was in the show's chorus line before she became famous

References

Notes

References 

Broadway musicals
Revues
All-Black cast Broadway shows
1924 musicals